Volcanoes Stadium is a minor league baseball park in the northwest United States, located in Keizer, Oregon.  It is the home field of the Salem-Keizer Volcanoes, formerly the Class A affiliate of the San Francisco Giants in the short-season Northwest League. It now plays host to the Corban University (https://www.corban.edu/) baseball team full time. The Warriors participate at the NAIA level and are members of the Cascade Collegiate Conference.

Nicknamed "Oregon's Field of Dreams", it opened  in 1997 and has a capacity of 4,254 people. The Volcanoes have won five Northwest League championships, in 1998, 2001, 2006, 2007, and 2009. The team moved to Salem-Keizer in 1997, after two seasons in Bellingham, Washington, preceded by eleven years in Everett.

The Stadium won a Design Award from the American Institute of Architects.  Since its construction, numerous upgrades have been completed at Volcanoes Stadium including 3 major buildings:  A 1,000 sq. ft. building was constructed to serve as a Weight Room for the Team and a 5,000+ sq. ft. building was built (2018) to serve as an indoor hitting facility, it houses four (4) cages.  Plus, a 1,200 sq. ft. group hospitality building was constructed.  Other additions include:  a Jumbotron with live video and instant replay capabilities and a separate Volcanotron LED auxiliary scoreboard, A children's play area, three (3) new concession buildings, five (5) new storage buildings, brand-new Stadium sound system (2019), construction of an on-field Group Party Patio, construction of an Entertainment Deck, installation of 4Topps seating, 300+ upper box seats, new Interstate 5 freeway marquee and expansion of the Stadium ticket office, and expansion of the Stadium Team Store. A VIP Hospitality Skybox Suite to complement the Stadium's other ten (10) skybox suites.

Salem's previous NWL teams in the 1980s played at Chemeketa Community College.

Due to the COVID-19 pandemic, the 2020 Minor League Baseball season was cancelled. Following the cancelled season, Major League Baseball took direct control of Minor League Baseball. The Northwest League was elevated to the High-A classification and contracted to six teams. Along with the Boise Hawks, the Volcanoes were not extended an invitation to continue as a franchise affiliated with a major league organization. The team, however, promised to continue playing in some form in 2021.

On January 26, 2021, the Volcanoes announced the creation of the Mavericks Independent Baseball League, set to begin play in May 2021 with four teams all playing their home games at Volcanoes Stadium: the Volcanoes, the Campesinos de Salem-Keizer (previously the Volcanoes' Copa de la Diversión alter-ego), and the revivals of the Portland Mavericks (an infamous independent Northwest League team which played from 1973 to 1977) and the Salem Senators (a name used by numerous Northwest League teams based in Salem throughout the 20th century).

Other uses

Volcanoes Stadium is used for other events, including RV shows, birthday parties, and concerts.

The stadium is home to the state high school baseball championships and local little league teams. It also serves as the home field for the baseball team at Corban University.

Under head coach Mike Bellotti, the University of Oregon Ducks played their spring football game at the stadium in early May 1998.

References

External links
Salem-Keizer Volcanoes
Volcanoes Stadium Views - Ball Parks of the Minor Leagues
Ballpark Reviews – Volcanoes Stadium

Baseball venues in Oregon
Keizer, Oregon
Buildings and structures in Marion County, Oregon
Tourist attractions in Marion County, Oregon
1997 establishments in Oregon
Sports venues completed in 1997
Salem-Keizer Volcanoes